Circé-class submarine may refer to one of the following classes of submarine for the French Navy:

  in service 1909–1918
  in service 1927–1942